Hemibagrus menoda, the Menoda catfish, is a bagrid catfish found in Bangladesh, and Nepal.

References 

 

Bagridae
Fish of Bangladesh
Fish of Nepal
Taxa named by Francis Buchanan-Hamilton
Fish described in 1822